Gridiron Flash is a 1934 film. It made a profit of $43,000.

Plot
Belford College's football team is so bad, unscrupulous benefactor Howard Smith recruits a jailed thief, Tommy "Cherub" Burke, after seeing him play with a football in the prison yard.

Tommy's parole is arranged. He joins the team, alienating other students with his behavior so much that Jane Thurston from the registrar's office takes a personal interest, unaware of his criminal history. The team wins every game but Tommy gets restless and wants to join a gang. Smith persuades him to rob the jewels of a rich couple, Mr. and Mrs. Fields, and split the loot.

Tommy commits the theft but gets a guilty conscience after being bribed to lose the team's final game. He returns the stolen gems and gets back to campus in time to lead Belford to one final triumph.

Cast
Eddie Quillan as Thomas Burke
Betty Furness as Jane Thurston
Grant Mitchell as Howard Smith
Lucien Littlefield as L.B Fields
Edgar Kennedy as Officer Thurston
Grady Sutton as Pudge Harrison
Joe Sawyer as Coach Eversmith
Margaret Dumont as Mrs. Fields

References

External links 
Gridiron Flash at IMDb

1934 comedy-drama films
1934 films
American football films
American comedy-drama films
American black-and-white films
1930s American films